Harvey Hart (August 30, 1928 – November 21, 1989) was a Canadian television and film director and a television producer.

Hart studied at the University of Toronto before being hired by the CBC in 1952. For them he created over 30 television productions, among them several episodes of an anthology series, Festival, like Home of the Brave (1961) and The Luck of Ginger Coffey (1961), adaptations of a 1946 play and 1960 novel.

In 1963 he left the CBC and moved to the United States, where, in the following years, he directed episodes for TV series such as The Alfred Hitchcock Hour and Star Trek, as well as theatrical features, including Bus Riley's Back in Town (1965) and The Sweet Ride (1968).

He moved back to Toronto in 1970 where he directed several feature films, including Fortune and Men's Eyes (1971), The Pyx (1973), Shoot (1976) and Goldenrod (1976), for which he won the Canadian Screen Award for Best Director. In the mid 1970s Hart directed four episodes of Columbo: By Dawn's Early Light (1974), A Deadly State of Mind (1975), Forgotten Lady (1975), and Now You See Him (1976).

He continued splitting his time between film work in Canada and television work in Los Angeles throughout the 1980s. He received a Golden Globe Award for Best Miniseries or Television Film for the mini-series East of Eden (1981) and a Gemini Award for Best Direction in a Dramatic Program or Mini-Series for the television crime-drama film Passion and Paradise (1989).

Harvey Hart died of a heart attack in 1989.

Selected filmography
The Luck of Ginger Coffey (1961) (TV)
Dark Intruder (1965)
Bus Riley's Back in Town (1965)
Sullivan's Empire (1967)
The Sweet Ride (1968)
Fortune and Men's Eyes (1971)
Mahoney's Last Stand (1972)
The Pyx (1973)
Goldenrod (1976)
Shoot (1976)
East of Eden (1981) (TV miniseries)
The High Country (1981)
Utilities (1983)
Beverly Hills Madam (1986) (TV)
Stone Fox (1987) (TV)
Passion and Paradise (1989) (TV)

References

External links

Complete Harvey Hart Filmography at CITWF

1928 births
1989 deaths
Film directors from Toronto
Canadian Broadcasting Corporation people
Canadian television directors
Canadian television producers
University of Toronto alumni
Best Director Genie and Canadian Screen Award winners